The 1967–68 season was the 95th season of competitive football in Scotland and the 71st season of Scottish league football.

Scottish League Division One

Champions: Celtic 
Relegated: Motherwell, Stirling Albion

Scottish League Division Two

Promoted: St Mirren, Arbroath

Cup honours

Other honours

National

County

 – aggregate over two legs – replay

Highland League

Individual honours

Scotland national team

1968 British Home Championship – Runners Up

Key:
(H) = Home match
(A) = Away match
ECQG8 = European Championship qualifying – Group 8
BHC = British Home Championship

Notes and references

External links
Scottish Football Historical Archive

 
Seasons in Scottish football